Erik Peter Häggström (born January 27, 1976 in Malmö) is a Swedish athlete who competed in the long jump. He represented Sweden at the 2000 Summer Olympics, where he placed 11th in his heat and 24th overall in the qualifying round. Following his retirement from competition, he began working for Swedish Television.

He came out as gay in November, 2009.

See also
 Homosexuality in sports
 Principle 6 campaign

References

 Sports-reference profile
 

1976 births
Living people
Athletes (track and field) at the 2000 Summer Olympics
Gay sportsmen
Swedish LGBT sportspeople
Olympic athletes of Sweden
Sportspeople from Malmö
Swedish male long jumpers
LGBT track and field athletes